Taufa'ao Filise (born May 26, 1977) is a Tongan rugby union footballer who played over 250 games for the Cardiff Blues.

Filise was born in Malapo near Nuku’alofa. and attended Tupou College. He started his professional rugby career in 2000 with Bay of Plenty in the National Provincial Championship. He was selected the following year for Tonga, and would go on to represent Tonga 17 times, including playing at the 2007 and 2011 Rugby World Cups. Filise would also represent the Pacific Islanders rugby union team in 2004 and 2006. 

He was picked up by the Blues (Super Rugby) for their 2005 Super Rugby campaign, and then signed for Bath Rugby on a year contract following that. After his season with Bath, Taufa'ao moved to Cardiff Blues for their 2006-2007 Celtic League campaign. He was part of the Cardiff teams that won the 2008–09 Anglo-Welsh Cup  and the 2009–10 European Challenge Cup. On December 19, 2015 he became the Cardiff Blues most capped player with 183 first class appearances. He made his 250th appearance for the club on 31 December 2017.

Filise finished his career playing for the Cardiff Blues in the Pro14. During his 13 years in Cardiff, Taufa'au amassed 255 appearances, with 9 tries and became a cult figure earning the nickname "The king of Tonga". His final game for the club was the European Rugby Challenge Cup final in Bilbao, which Cardiff won 31-30.

References

External links
Cardiff profile
ERC Rugby profile
Pacific Island players in the Heineken Cup
King of Tonga

1977 births
Bay of Plenty rugby union players
Cardiff Rugby players
Expatriate rugby union players in England
Expatriate rugby union players in New Zealand
Expatriate rugby union players in Wales
Living people
Pacific Islanders rugby union players
People from Tongatapu
Rugby union props
Tonga international rugby union players
Tongan expatriate rugby union players
Tongan expatriate sportspeople in New Zealand
Tongan expatriate sportspeople in England
Tongan expatriate sportspeople in Wales
Tongan rugby union players